The Powell River is a river in the northern Sunshine Coast region of British Columbia, Canada that flows a short distance through the eponymous city of Powell River, British Columbia to enter the Salish Sea. It is one of the shortest rivers in the world, measuring 500 Meters in length.

Name origin
Along with Powell Lake, it was named for Dr. Israel Wood Powell, a medical doctor and educator who was a veteran of the Cariboo Gold Rush.  Dr. Powell was Commissioner for Indian Affairs for British Columbia from 1873 to 1881.

See also
List of British Columbia rivers

References

Powell River, British Columbia
Rivers of the Pacific Ranges
New Westminster Land District